Joseph McKay Bannerman, (March 12, 1850 – April 17, 1932) was a Scottish-born Canadian politician. He served on the Legislative Assembly of the Northwest Territories for East Calgary from 1894 to 1898. He was one of Calgary's first members of the legislature.

Bannerman was born at Helmsdale, Scotland, the son of Thomas and Barbara (née McKay) Bannerman. He married Christina Sutherland (also Scottish), of Winnipeg in 1885; with her he had five children. After Christina's death in 1907, he remarried English-born Emma Northfield. After Emma's death in 1917, he married her sister, Ruth. Bannerman came to Alberta, settling in Edmonton in 1882, and Calgary the year after. With his brother, he was a flour and feed as well as liquor merchant. A Protestant, he also served at a time as a City of Calgary alderman in the 1880s. Though he was politically affiliated with the Conservative Party of Canada, he served as an Independent in the Legislative Assembly.

He was elected in 1894 to the Legislative Assembly of the Northwest Territories, and served until his defeat in 1898. Upon his defeat, he lived in Banff, Alberta. He died in Calgary in 1932.

Electoral results

1894 election

1898 election

References

1850 births
1932 deaths
Members of the Legislative Assembly of the Northwest Territories
Calgary city councillors
People from Helmsdale